La Martiniquaise is France's second-largest (after Pernod Ricard) spirits group, founded in 1934, by the father of the current head, the billionaire Jean-Pierre Cayard.

History
After the Second World War the company decided to diversify into different kind of spirits. Over the decades La Martiniquaise acquired more than a dozen spirit companies.
In Scotland it operates two Whisky distilleries: Glen Moray distillery in Speyside and Starlaw distillery, a grain distillery at Bathgate in West Lothian, Lowlands.

Brands
The company's brands include different kind of spirits from North America, Europe, the Caribbean and France. 

 Whisky: Their two scottish distilleries produce whisky for their blends but also Single Malt Whiskies Glen Moray and Glen Turner. With Cutty Sark and Label 5 blended Scotch whiskies the company own two of the most popular Scotch Blends. They also distribute Canadian Whisky (Sam Barton) and Bourbon Whiskey Old Virginia. 
 Rum: Two local brands, one each from Martinique (Saint James) and Réunion (Riviere du Mat). One blended Rum Negrita, that contains rums from Martinique, Reunion and Guadeloupe.
 wine based products: The company has one brand each for products like the Porto Cruz Port wine, French wine aperitif, Prosecco, sparkling wine and Kir Royal.
 other spirits: Two pastis, one brand each of Vodka, Gin, Anisette, Cognac and Calvados.

References

External links
Official website

Drink companies of France
Food and drink companies established in 1934
French companies established in 1934
1934 establishments in France